Chromolaena sinuata, the wavyleaf thoroughwort, is a Caribbean species of flowering shrub in the family Asteraceae. It is found on the Islands of Cuba, Hispaniola, Puerto Rico, Guadeloupe, Martinique, La Desirade, Montserrat, St. Eustatius, and Antigua.

References

External links
 photo of herbarium specimen at Missouri Botanical Garden, collected in Dominican Republic

sinuata
Flora of the Caribbean
Plants described in 1788
Flora without expected TNC conservation status